Hugh Addison Shirreff (February 16, 1918 – January 8, 1995) was a Canadian politician. He served in the Legislative Assembly of British Columbia from 1956 to 1960  from the electoral district of Skeena, a member of the Social Credit Party.

References

British Columbia Social Credit Party MLAs
1918 births
1995 deaths